Čepić or Cepich is a village in Istria, Croatia with a population of 57 as of 2011. The name is also spelled Ceppi, Cepic, Čepich, or Ceppich.

Population

References

Populated places in Istria County